The Dipper mansion (斗宿, pinyin: Dǒu Xiù) is one of the Twenty-eight mansions of the Chinese constellations.  It is one of the northern mansions of the Black Tortoise. In Taoism, it is known as the "Six Stars of the Southern Dipper" (南斗六星, Nándǒu liù xīng), in contrast to the Big Dipper north to this mansion.

Asterisms

Stars
 ζ Sgr
 τ Sgr
 σ Sgr
 φ Sgr
 λ Sgr
 μ Sgr

Chinese constellations